Chaman bombing may refer to: 

2017 Chaman suicide bombing
2021 Chaman bombings